The Royal World Weightlifting Championships 2007 were held at the 700th Anniversary Sports Complex in Chiang Mai, Thailand. The event took place from September 17 to September 26, 2007.

Medal summary

Men

Women

Medal table
Ranking by Big (Total result) medals 

Ranking by all medals: Big (Total result) and Small (Snatch and Clean & Jerk)

Team ranking

Men

Women

Participating nations
580 competitors from 82 nations participated.

 (1)
 (15)
 (3)
 (8)
 (2)
 (15)
 (1)
 (15)
 (2)
 (12)
 (15)
 (15)
 (15)
 (1)
 (8)
 (2)
 (6)
 (7)
 (2)
 (10)
 (2)
 (1)
 (4)
 (15)
 (6)
 (10)
 (6)
 (15)
 (2)
 (1)
 (11)
 (9)
 (14)
 (8)
 (5)
 (2)
 (9)
 (15)
 (15)
 (1)
 (6)
 (6)
 (2)
 (2)
 (6)
 (7)
 (7)
 (1)
 (6)
 (4)
 (2)
 (1)
 (8)
 (12)
 (1)
 (1)
 (1)
 (15)
 (3)
 (7)
 (15)
 (2)
 (8)
 (1)
 (5)
 (15)
 (15)
 (1)
 (2)
 (1)
 (15)
 (1)
 (3)
 (15)
 (8)
 (1)
 (15)
 (15)
 (8)
 (14)
 (14)
 (2)

References 

Weightlifting World Championships Seniors Statistics

External links
Official website

 
W
World Weightlifting Championships
World Weightlifting Championships
W